Nilson Lombardi (January 3, 1926 – April 9, 2008) was a pianist, composer and Brazilian maestro with a vast contribution to the classical music in many countries. His compositions have also been interpreted in international recitals and recordings on disc by Eudoxia de Barros, Attilio Mastrogiovanni, Orlando Retroz, Beatriz Balzi, and others.

Lombarti was awarded the APCA prize of São Paulo Association of Art Critics of classical music lovers and artists influencing contemporary classical music in Brazil and abroad. Nilson Lombardi worked with Mozart Camargo Guarnieri (1907–1993), one of the most important contributors of Brazilian music. Lombardi was defined as a follower of the work of Guarnieri.

Nilson Lombardi's family made the donation collection of the composer at the Tatuí Musical Conservatory "Dr. Carlos Campos", the Conservatory of Tatuí. The collection includes about 600 items, including books, music, trophies, a typewriter, and every work of Nilson Lombardi.

Complete works
List of complete works of Nilson Lombardi

Piano

Twelve Ponteios
Six Miniatures
Three Cantinelas
Theme and twelve variations of "Mucama Bonita"
Estudo number one
Reminiscenses Homage to Schumann
Sleep baby
Ponteio "Aunt Serenade"
Homage to Ravel
Miniature 14
Miniature 16
Miniature 17

Ciclo Miniatura para Piano a Quatro Mãos

Acalanto 1 and 2
Baião 1 and 2
Choro 1 and 2
Toada 1 and 2
Waltz 1 and 2

Miniature cycles for two pianos

Acalanto 1 and 2
Baião 1 and 2
Choro 1 and 2
Toada 1 and 2
Waltz 1 and 2

Piano and choral

Beach sing
Full stars night
Three Folk's songs
Cabôco of the Black Land
In the Umbando I am the Guiné
Give me a balance to my side
There´s no Love
The Heart Shadow
Christmas Meditation
Come, my love

Chamber music

Cantinela for Piano and Clarinet
Two Voices Invention
Trio Trombone, Trumpet and Piano
Cantinela for Strings Orchestra
Toada
Acalanto
Ponteio for Strings Orchestra

Symphonic orchestra

Six Miniatures
Orchestra Suite
Double
Waltz
Baião
Six Variations of a Theme about Schoenberg
Three Cantinelas
Cadence for Concert in F Minor for Piano and Strings of J. S. Bach
Cadence for Concert in A bemol, Opus 19, of Beethoven

Choral sings

Teresa
Where do you go Helena?
Canide Iune
Ina Ina Mojubara
Uiê Ôri Rumbá
Etiô
3rd Centennial of Sorocaba Hymn
Cantata "The Zumbi's Death"

References

External links 
 About Nilson Lombardi
 Tatuí Conservatory, SP, Brazil

1926 births
2008 deaths
Sorocaba
Brazilian pianists
Brazilian composers
Brazilian conductors (music)
People from Sorocaba
20th-century pianists
20th-century conductors (music)